Liggett Select is an American brand of cigarettes, currently owned and manufactured by the Liggett Group, based in Mebane, North Carolina.

History
Liggett Select was launched in 1999 as a discount brand. Liggett Select is the company's top seller.

In 2011, Liggett Vector Brands announced they would increase the price by 8 cents of their deep-discount brands: Liggett Select, Eve and Grand Prix.

In 2017, Liggett Select got a new pack design for all its variants.

Products

King-size
 Liggett Select Red Kings 
 Liggett Select Blue Kings
 Liggett Select Menthol Gold Kings
 Liggett Select Menthol Silver Kings
 Liggett Select Non-filter Kings

100s
 Liggett Select Red 100s
 Liggett Select Blue 100s
 Liggett Select Orange 100s
 Liggett Select Menthol Gold 100s
 Liggett Select Menthol Silver 100s

See also
 Cigarette
 Tobacco smoking

References

Liggett Group brands